Villelongue-dels-Monts is a commune in the Pyrénées-Orientales department in southern France.

The inhabitants are called Villelonguais.

Geography
Villelongue-dels-Monts is located in the south of the department of Pyrénées-Orientales, 33 km south of Perpignan, 18 km east from the Mediterranean Sea and 17 km from the Spanish border by Le Perthus, in the canton of Vallespir-Albères and in the arrondissement of Céret.

Its close neighbouring communities are : in the north Banyuls-dels-Aspres, Brouilla and Saint-Génis-des-Fontaines ; in the east Laroque-des-Albères ; in the south l'Albère and in the west Montesquieu-des-Albères.

With a surface of 1155 hectares, the territory is narrow and long (2 km from east to west and 8 km from north to south).

History
Villelongue-dels-Monts is named after the peak above the village which means « Villelongue-du-Mont ». It was mentioned for the first time in 981. Eventually, the monastery of Saint-Génis-des-Fontaines possessed a freehold on "Villalonga". The phrase "Castrum Sancti Christophori" appeared in 1095 to indicate the fortress constructed on the rocky peak.

Politics and administration

Mayors

Demography 
The communal demography is marked by a certain stability between 1851 and 1975, fluctuating in a minimum of population of 408 in 1968 and a maximum of 533 in 1891, and alternating between the periods of growth and decline.

In 1975, Villelongue-dels-Monts began to grow. The population more than doubled in 30 years, from 513 inhabitants in 1975 to 1346 in 2006.

This growth is largely related to the growth of the metropolitan area of Perpignan.

Sites of interest 
Santa Maria del Vilar

See also
Communes of the Pyrénées-Orientales department

References

External links

Official website of Villelongue dels Monts
Site of Santa Maria del Vilar

Villelongue-dels-Monts